Gevuina avellana (Chilean hazelnut ( in Spanish), or Gevuina hazelnut), is an evergreen tree, up to 20 meters (65 feet) tall. It is the only species currently classified in the genus Gevuina. It is native to southern Chile and adjacent valleys in Argentina. It is found from sea level to 700 meters (2300 feet) above sea level. Its distribution extends from 35° to 44° south latitude. The composite leaves are bright green and toothed, and the tree is in flower between July and November. The flowers are very small and beige to whitish, are bisexual and group two by two in long racemes. The fruit is a dark red nut when young and turns black. The peel is woody. It can grow up straight or branched from the soil, making up either a tree or a shrub.

The origin of the Spanish name, avellano come from the fact the Spanish settlers found the nuts similar to the hazelnuts they knew from Europe. Yet the species are not closely related.

The concentration of Gevuina avellana in forest is highly irregular and difficult to predict. It may grow on flatland or hilly terrain, in clay or stony soils. Usually Gevuina avellana grows in association to other broad-leaved trees such as Nothofagus obliqua, Nothofagus dombeyi, Nothofagus alpina, Nothofagus glauca or Laureliopsis. Yet it does also grow in associations dominated by the conifers Austrocedrus, Fitzroya and Pilgerodendron. As such Gevuina avellana does not form pure stands.

Taxonomy
Gevuina is a genus of either 1 or 3 species of the family Proteaceae. In some classifications, Gevuinia is recognised with three species: one endemic to Australia (Gevuina bleasdalei), another to New Guinea (Gevuina papuana), and one species in both Chile (Gevuina avellana). Other taxonomic reports place the Australian and New Guinea species in the genus Bleasdalea or in the Fijian endemic genus Turrillia, and leave Gevuina with only Gevuina avellana. The Flora of Australia retains these 2 species in Gevuinia, but the most recent classification places the Australian and New Guinea species as Bleasdalea bleasdalei and B. papuana

Uses and cultivation

The seeds are eaten raw, cooked in boiling water or toasted. The nuts contain about 12 percent protein, 49 percent oil, and 24 percent carbohydrates. The seed has a very high concentration of monounsaturated oils and is also obtained for several purposes in Chile. It is rich in antioxidants such as vitamin E (α-tocotrienol) and β-carotene. Its oil is an ingredient in some sunscreens. Gevuina oil is used as a cosmetic ingredient for its moisturizing qualities and because it is a source of omega 7 fatty acids (palmitoleic acid). Production of seeds may vary greatly from tree to tree.

The tree is a good honey plant for bees and is also cultivated as an ornamental plant. The seed shells contain tannin that is used for tanning leather. The tree has an acceptable frost resistance (at least  −12 °C (10 °F)) when mature. The wood is cream-colored with dark brown streaking and is used in cabinetry and musical instruments.
It was introduced to Great Britain in 1826. It grows well there, in Ireland and in New Zealand and California. A few specimens are cultivated in Spain and in the Pacific Northwest of the United States. It grows well in temperate oceanic climates with cool temperatures where frosts occur commonly in winter, and has thrived in southern New Zealand. It needs 5 years to first harvest and 7 or 8 years for full production. In Seattle, Washington, squirrels and birds eat seeds from the trees. New varieties of greater yield than the original wild stock are being developed in both Chile and New Zealand. 

As of 1982 only a tiny faction of the nuts of wild stands were collected for processing.

Gallery

See also
Avellanita bustillosii

Notes

Reference

Sources
Rodríguez, Roberto; Mathei, Oscar y Quezada, Max. 1983. Flora arbórea de Chile. Universidad de Concepción. 408p.
Donoso, C. 2005. Árboles nativos de Chile. Guía de reconocimiento. Edición 4. Marisa Cuneo Ediciones, Valdivia, Chile. 136p.
Hoffmann, A. 1982. Flora silvestre de Chile zona araucana. Edición 4. Ediciones Fundación Claudio Gay, Santiago, Chile. 258p.
Muñoz, M. 1980. Flora del Parque Nacional Puyehue. Editorial Universitaria, Santiago, Chile. 557p.

Proteaceae
Flora of Argentina
Flora of central Chile
Fruit trees
Trees of Chile
Chilean Matorral
Monotypic Proteaceae genera
Crops originating from Chile
Edible nuts and seeds
Trees of mild maritime climate
Garden plants of South America
Ornamental trees